Balkongen was an avant-garde theatre in Oslo established in 1927 and disestablished in 1928. Its founder and artistic director was Agnes Mowinckel.

References

Former theatres in Norway
Performing groups established in 1927
1927 establishments in Norway
1928 disestablishments in Norway
Theatres in Oslo